is a 2014 Japanese romantic drama film directed by Kazuyoshi Kumakiri and based on Kazuki Sakuraba's Watashi no Otoko novel. It was released on 14 June 2014 in Japan. The film won the Golden George at the 36th Moscow International Film Festival and Tadanobu Asano won the award for Best Actor. Fumi Nikaidō won International Rising Star Award for this film at New York Asian Film Festival and Best Actress at 6th TAMA Film Awards.

Story
Young Hana had lost everything in the earthquake and tsunami and was being taken care of by a relative named Jungo. As Hana grew up she began to fall in love with her own relative.

Cast
Fumi Nikaidō as Hana Kusarino
Tadanobu Asano as Jungo Kusarino
Kengo Kora as Yoshiro Ozaki
Mochika Yamada as Hana (10 years old)

Reception
The film has grossed ¥19.4 million in Japan.

References

External links
 

2014 romantic drama films
2014 films
Films based on Japanese novels
Films directed by Kazuyoshi Kumakiri
Japanese romantic drama films
2010s Japanese films
2010s Japanese-language films